Richèl Hogenkamp was the defending champion, but lost to Valentini Grammatikopoulou in the second round.

Vera Lapko won the title after defeating Quirine Lemoine 6–2, 6–4 in the final.

Seeds

Draw

Finals

Top half

Bottom half

References
Main Draw

Engie Open Saint-Gaudens Occitanie - Singles